Juriaen Pool (bapt. 17 January 1666, Amsterdam – 6 October 1745, Amsterdam), was an 18th-century painter from the Northern Netherlands best known as the husband of Rachel Ruysch, with whom he had ten children.

Biography

According to the RKD he was the son of Jurriaan Pool the elder. He became engaged on 25 July 1693 and on 12 August he married the flower painter Rachel Ruysch in Buiksloot. He became the teacher of the painter Gerhard Jan Palthe.

References

Juriaen Pool on Artnet

External links

1666 births
1745 deaths
17th-century Dutch painters
18th-century Dutch painters
18th-century Dutch male artists
Dutch male painters
Painters from Amsterdam